If I Were Queen is a lost 1922 American silent romantic drama film directed by Wesley Ruggles and starring Ethel Clayton. It is based on a short story by Du Vernett Rabell. FBO handled the distribution of the film. It is not known whether the film currently survives.

The title of the film may have been changed from that of the original short story because it bears slight resemblance to the Fox film If I Were King, which had come out a couple years before.

Cast
Ethel Clayton as Ruth Townley
Andree Lejon as Oluf
Warner Baxter as Vladimir
Victory Bateman as Aunt Ollie
Murdock MacQuarrie as Duke of Wortz
Genevieve Blinn as Sister Ursula

References

External links

1922 films
American silent feature films
Films based on short fiction
Films directed by Wesley Ruggles
1922 romantic drama films
American romantic drama films
American black-and-white films
Film Booking Offices of America films
1920s American films
Silent romantic drama films
Silent American drama films